Matjaž Zupan (born 27 September 1968 in Kranj) is a Slovenian former ski jumper who competed for the former Yugoslavia and afterwards for independent Slovenia from 1987 to 1994. He won a silver medal in the team large hill competition at the 1988 Winter Olympics in Calgary.

His best finish at the FIS Nordic World Ski Championships was 4th in the individual large hill event in 1987.

After his jumping days were over he a started successful coaching career. He was the coach of the Slovenian national ski jumping team from 1999 to 2006. His biggest successes were when Rok Benkovič won normal hill in World Championship in Oberstdorf and also bronze medal in same competition with Slovenian team. In 2002 he launched Slovenian eagles to the team bronze in Olympic games in Salt Lake City. After 2006 he quit his post as a coach and was replaced with Vasja Bajc. He took over Czech national team and stay there for three successful seasons. After that he quit so he could once again became head coach for his beloved Slovenia. His tenure was between 2009 and 2011. The second time the results were not so good and he was replaced with the most successful coach in Slovenian ski jumping history - Goran Janus who was his former jumper. In 2011 he became coach for the French ski jumping national team. With moderate success he coached them for two years, to the end of the 2014 Olympic cycle. On May,24th was announcement that he became new head coach of Russian national ski jumping team and their new ambitious program to launch Russia among best ski jumping nations. He was also able to choose his own assistant. He chose his countryman Matjaž Triplat. Matjaž Triplat was former head coach of Slovenian women ski jumping team.

He is engaged from Bulgarian Olympic Committee as coach of Ski jumping team of Bulgaria for 2018 Winter Olympics games.

Family
He currently resides with his wife, Birgette in Cheltenham, England. He also has 2 children.

References

External links

 

1966 births
Living people
Yugoslav male ski jumpers
Slovenian male ski jumpers
Ski jumpers at the 1988 Winter Olympics
Ski jumpers at the 1992 Winter Olympics
Ski jumpers at the 1994 Winter Olympics
Olympic ski jumpers of Yugoslavia
Olympic ski jumpers of Slovenia
Olympic silver medalists for Yugoslavia
Slovenian ski jumping coaches
Olympic medalists in ski jumping
Sportspeople from Kranj
Medalists at the 1988 Winter Olympics